Rodrigo Santana (born 17 April 1979), commonly known as Rodrigão, is a Brazilian former volleyball player who won a gold medal at the 2004 Summer Olympics and a silver medal at the 2008 Summer Olympics and 2012 Summer Olympics. Santana with brazil team won the World Championship in 2002 Argentina, 2006 Japan and 2010 Italy. He also won the World Cup, the Pan-American Games, and the South American Championship, in Chile, where he was elected as the Best attacker.

He was born in São Paulo.

Sporting achievements

Clubs
 1996/1997  Brazilian Superliga, with Minas Tênis Clube
 2005/2006  Italian League, with Lube Volley

CEV Challenge Cup
  2005/2006 – with Lube Volley

National team 
 2000  FIVB World League
 2001  FIVB World League
 2001  South American Championship
 2001  FIVB World Grand Champions Cup
 2002  FIVB World League
 2002  FIVB World Championship
 2003  FIVB World League
 2003  Pan American Games
 2003  South American Championship
 2003  FIVB World Cup
 2004  FIVB World League
 2004  Olympic Games
 2005  FIVB World League
 2005  South American Championship
 2005  FIVB World Grand Champions Cup
 2006  FIVB World League
 2006  FIVB World Championship
 2007  FIVB World League
 2007  Pan American Games
 2007  South American Championship
 2007  FIVB World Cup
 2008  Olympic Games
 2009  FIVB World League
 2009  South American Championship
 2009  FIVB World Grand Champions Cup
 2010  FIVB World League
 2010  FIVB World Championship
 2011  FIVB World League
 2011  South American Championship
 2011  FIVB World Cup
 2012  Olympic Games

Individual
 2007 South American Championship – Best Spiker
 2011 South American Club Championship – Best Blocker

References

External links
 
 
 

1979 births
Living people
Brazilian men's volleyball players
Volleyball players at the 2004 Summer Olympics
Volleyball players at the 2008 Summer Olympics
Volleyball players at the 2012 Summer Olympics
Olympic volleyball players of Brazil
Olympic gold medalists for Brazil
Olympic silver medalists for Brazil
Volleyball players at the 2007 Pan American Games
Olympic medalists in volleyball
Medalists at the 2012 Summer Olympics
Medalists at the 2008 Summer Olympics
Medalists at the 2004 Summer Olympics
Volleyball players at the 2003 Pan American Games
Pan American Games bronze medalists for Brazil
Pan American Games gold medalists for Brazil
Pan American Games medalists in volleyball
Medalists at the 2003 Pan American Games
Medalists at the 2007 Pan American Games
Middle blockers
Sportspeople from São Paulo